This is a list of members of the Riksdag, the national parliament of Sweden. The Riksdag is a unicameral assembly with 349 members of parliament, who are elected on a proportional basis to serve fixed terms of four years. In the Riksdag, members are seated per constituency and not party. The following MPs were elected in the 2002 Swedish general election and served until the 2006 Swedish general election. Members of the social democratic Cabinet of Göran Persson, the ruling party during this term, are marked in bold, party leaders of the seven parties represented in the Riksdag in italic.

List

Members who have resigned

Notes

References 

2002-2006